The American Association on Intellectual and Developmental Disabilities (AAIDD) is an American non-profit organization focusing on intellectual disability and related developmental disabilities. AAIDD has members in the United States and more than 50 other countries.

History
The AAIDD was founded in 1876 by Édouard Séguin,  and is the oldest professional association concerned with intellectual and developmental disabilities. AAIDD advocates for the equality, dignity, and human rights of people with intellectual and developmental disabilities, and for their full inclusion and participation in society. It is headquartered in Silver Spring, Maryland, a suburb of Washington DC.

The name of the association has changed five times in its history, reflecting the changes in thinking about the condition known today as intellectual disability:
 1876: Association of Medical Officers of American Institutions for Idiotic and Feebleminded Persons
 1906: American Association for the Study of the Feebleminded
 1933: American Association on Mental Deficiency
 1987: American Association on Mental Retardation
 2007: American Association on Intellectual and Developmental Disabilities

Mission and goals
The AAIDD's stated mission is to promote progressive policies, sound research, effective practices, and universal human rights for people with intellectual and developmental disabilities.

The association's goals are to:
 Enhance the capacity of professionals who work with individuals with intellectual and developmental disabilities.
 Promote the development of a society that fully includes individuals with intellectual and developmental disabilities. 
 Sustain an effective, responsive, well managed, and responsibly-governed organization.
It also has various sub-groups with more specific interests, such as the Religion and Spirituality Interest Network, "an interfaith, interdisciplinary association of professional ordained and lay people who journey with persons with developmental disabilities and their families."

Publications
The AAIDD publishes books, evidenced-based assessment tools, and three peer-reviewed journals.

Journals
The AAIDD encourages a diversity of contributions from different traditions of inquiry and disciplines; all papers must meet the  journals' criteria for rigor and peer review to be considered for publication.
 Established in 1896, American Journal on Intellectual and Developmental Disabilities (AJIDD) is a multidisciplinary journal for reporting original contributions of the highest quality on intellectual disability, its causes, treatment, and prevention. Like its parent organization, the journal has had multiple names through its history. It began as simply the journal of the proceedings and addresses from the association's annual conference, published under the corresponding name of the association. In 1939, it expanded beyond the annual conference report and became known as American Journal of Mental Deficiency. From 1987 until 2007, it was titled the American Journal of Mental Retardation, after which it was given its current title. It is focused primarily on scientific and medical studies and reviews.
 Established in 1963, Intellectual and Developmental Disabilities (IDD) is a journal of current policy, best practices, and new perspectives on intellectual and developmental disabilities. IDD provides a forum for the dissemination of rigorously reviewed, actionable information and transformative concepts, with a focus on praxis over theory.
 Established in 2013, Inclusion is a multidisciplinary journal that provides a forum for the presentation and discussion of evidence-based interventions and strategies that promote the full inclusion of those with intellectual and developmental disabilities in society at large.

Books and Assessment Tools 
The AAIDD publishes essential books and tools for professionals and others in the field of intellectual and developmental disabilities. The organization's most well-known book is its definition manual, first published in 1910 and now in its 11th edition: Intellectual Disability: Definition, Classification, and Systems of Support.

It also publishes Supports Intensity Scales (SIS), a group of assessment tools that evaluate the practical support requirements of people with intellectual disabilities.  It is available in a child version (SIS-C) and an adult version (SIS-A).  Both versions assess someone's needed level of support, but adjust for differences in age-related expectations. For example, a child would be expected to have a full-time, live-in caretaker (i.e. a parent or guardian) while for an adult that would qualify as extra support. The assessment is done through semi-structured interviews with those who can give insight to the daily life of the person being assessed, up to and including the person themselves when appropriate. The SIS measures support needs in multiple areas of daily life, including housing, education, employment, medical services, and social activities. Assessors rate different categories according to the frequency of support (e.g., none, at least once a month), amount of support (e.g., none, less than 30 minutes), and type of support (e.g., monitoring, verbal gesturing) that a person requires. The overall Supports Intensity Level is determined based on the Total Support Needs Index, which is a standard score generated from the individual ratings.

Education
As the oldest professional organization in the field of intellectual and developmental disabilities, AAIDD offers educational opportunities to the global disability community, including an annual conference, webinars, and professional research exchanges.

The association's YouTube channel provides short educational videos on topics related to intellectual and developmental disabilities.

See also 
 Frank Rusch, awarded the American Association on Mental Retardation’s "Educator of the Year Award"
 Special education in the United States

References

External links
 

Intellectual disability organizations
Medical associations based in the United States
Medical and health organizations based in Washington, D.C.
Medical and health organizations based in Maryland